David Claessen is a Dutch cinematographer and director.

Education
Claessen attended the Netherlands Film Academy in Amsterdam.

Films
In 1983, he shot Haute Mer, directed by French filmmaker Edgardo Cozarinsky.

In 1997 Claessen met director Julie Dash. They have collaborated on four films together: including the award-winning The Rosa Parks Story, Love Song (2000), Brothers of the Borderland (2004), and Travel Notes of a Geechee Girl (2016).

Personal life
In 1986, Claessen moved to the United States where he met Whoopi Goldberg during production of a documentary entitled Who Are They? They married in September 1986 and divorced two years later.

References

Year of birth missing (living people)
Living people
Dutch cinematographers
Dutch film directors
Hofstra University faculty
People from New York City
20th-century Dutch people